Omocestus rufipes, the woodland grasshopper, is a species of short-horned grasshopper belonging to subfamily Gomphocerinae. The Latin species name rufipes means red-footed, from rufus (red) + pes (foot), with reference to the color of the legs.

Distribution and habitat
This species is present in most of Europe, in the eastern Palearctic realm, in North Africa, and in the Near East. In the British Isles this species is restricted to southern England (see map).

These grasshoppers inhabit meadows, grasslands and sunny clearings in woodlands.

Description

The basic coloration of the body varies from light brown to blackish. The dorsal side is usually beige in males, brown or green in females. Pronotum has a white edge. The hindwings are dark in their rear half in the male as in the female. In mature adults the underside of the apex of the abdomen is reddish or orange.

The apex of the maxillary palps is almost white. In males the tip of the abdomen is red. The males always show red rear tibias and often red rear femurs.

Biology
They can be encountered from early June through late October. They mainly feed on grasses and various herbaceous plants.

Eggs are laid in clusters just below the surface of the soil or in the roots of plants. Nymphs appear in April or May.

Gallery

References

 Nunner, A. (1998): Omocestus rufipes – Buntbäuchiger Grashüpfer. In: Detzel, P.: Die Heuschrecken Baden-Württembergs. Ulmer, Stuttgart. 420–427 S

rufipes
Insects described in 1821
Orthoptera of Europe